Mălâncrav may refer to the following entities of Romania:
 Mălâncrav (village)
 Mălâncrav (river)